Juniata Iron Works, also known as the Hatfield Iron Works, is a national historic district located at Porter Township in Huntingdon County, Pennsylvania. It consists of six contributing buildings associated with a former ironworks: two ironmaster's mansions, a store and post office, a grist mill, and two workers houses.  The first ironmaster's mansion was built in 1841, and is a -story brick house with a rear ell. The second ironmaster's mansion dates to 1867, and is a -story brick house with a rear ell.  It features a Federal style main entrance.  The store and post office has a brick first story and frame second story and houses a bed and breakfast.  The -story grist mill was built in 1856.  The buildings are associated with a historic iron furnace first developed on the south side of the Frankstown Branch of the Juniata River.  The complex moved to the north side in the late-1840s. The iron works closed in the mid-1870s and the machinery dismantled.

It was listed on the National Register of Historic Places in 1990.

References 

Industrial buildings and structures on the National Register of Historic Places in Pennsylvania
Historic districts on the National Register of Historic Places in Pennsylvania
Houses completed in 1841
Industrial buildings completed in 1856
Buildings and structures in Huntingdon County, Pennsylvania
National Register of Historic Places in Huntingdon County, Pennsylvania
1856 establishments in Pennsylvania